Lloyd Harris and Dudi Sela were the defending champions but chose not to defend their title.

Harri Heliövaara and Sem Verbeek won the title after defeating Luca Margaroli and Andrea Vavassori 7–6(7–5), 7–6(7–4) in the final.

Seeds

Draw

References

External links
 Main draw

Burnie International - Men's Doubles